Xu Xisheng (born April 1964) is a lieutenant general in the People's Liberation Army of China.

He is a representative of the 20th National Congress of the Chinese Communist Party and a member of the 20th Central Committee of the Chinese Communist Party.  He was a delegate to the 13th National People's Congress.

Biography
Xu was born in Xintai County (now Xintai), Shandong, in April 1964.

Xu once served as political commissar of the Fuzhou Command Post of the People's Liberation Army Air Force, director of the Political Department of the Beijing Military Region Air Force, and director of the Political Work Department of the Central Theater Command Air Force.

He was deputy political commissar of the Southern Theater Command in July 2017, in addition to serving as political commissar of the Southern Theater Command Air Force.   

He attained the rank of lieutenant general (zhongjiang) in July 2018.

References

1964 births
Living people
People from Tai'an
People's Liberation Army generals from Shandong
People's Republic of China politicians from Shandong
Chinese Communist Party politicians from Shandong
Members of the 20th Central Committee of the Chinese Communist Party
Delegates to the 13th National People's Congress